Daniel Blagrave (1603–1668) was a prominent resident of the town of Reading, in the English county of Berkshire. He was Member of Parliament for the Parliamentary Borough of Reading over several periods between 1640 and 1660, and was also one of the signatories of King Charles I's death warrant.

Of a branch of the Blagraves of Calcot Manor, near Reading, Daniel Blagrave was educated at Reading School and trained to be a lawyer. Daniel Blagrave's uncle was the mathematician John Blagrave of Southcote Manor, in what is now the Reading suburb of Southcote, and Daniel inherited the manor on John's death. In 1643 he permitted the Earl of Essex to use the manor as the Roundhead headquarters during the Siege of Reading. He was Recorder of Reading from 1645 to 1656 and again from 1658.

During the Commonwealth, Daniel Blagrave held various commissions and posts, and is said to have become a very wealthy man as a consequence.

On the restoration of King Charles II, Daniel Blagrave fled the country and settled at Aachen, in what is now Germany, where he died in 1668.

References

1603 births
1668 deaths
People educated at Reading School
Members of the Parliament of England (pre-1707) for Reading
Regicides of Charles I
People from Reading, Berkshire
English MPs 1640–1648
English MPs 1648–1653
English MPs 1659